The Midland Railway (MR) 2441 Class was a class of steam locomotive. They were introduced by Samuel Johnson in 1899, originally with round-topped fireboxes. Henry Fowler later rebuilt them with Belpaire fireboxes.  They were given the power classification 3F. The LMS Fowler Class 3F of 1924 was based on this design.

Numbering
Sixty locomotives were built. Initially numbered 2441–2460, 2741–2780; they were renumbered 1900–1959 in the Midland Railway's 1907 renumbering scheme. All passed to the London, Midland and Scottish Railway, initially retaining their MR numbers, before being renumbered 7200–7259 between 1934 and 1937. All passed into British Railways ownership in 1948 and were numbered 47200–47259.

Withdrawal
Withdrawals started in 1954, with three locomotives still in service on 1 January 1966. All were scrapped, though several later LMS locomotives have survived.

Accidents and incidents
On 12 July 1932, locomotive No. 1909 was hauling a freight train that collided with a passenger train that had been derailed by catch points at  station. It was also derailed, as were five wagons. There were no injuries.

References

External links 

 Class 3F-E Details at Rail UK

2441
0-6-0T locomotives
Vulcan Foundry locomotives
Railway locomotives introduced in 1899
Standard gauge steam locomotives of Great Britain
Scrapped locomotives